Eucosma balatonana is a moth belonging to the family Tortricidae. The species was first described by Osthelder in 1937.

It is native to Europe.

References

Eucosmini